A portable CD player is a portable audio player used to play compact discs. The first audio player released was the Discman D-50 by Sony.

Features 

The basic features of a portable CD player are:

Play/Pause button
Stop button
Rewind button
Fast forward button 
Hold button (some models)
Liquid crystal display
Headphone/Audio out socket

The play/pause button allows the user to pause in the middle of a track (song) and resume play where the listener left off by pressing the button again. The stop button stops play. The fast forward and rewind buttons can be held down to move rapidly forward (fast forward) or backward (rewind) in a track; play will resume once the button is released. The liquid crystal display provides a visual indicator of remaining battery life, the number of the track currently playing, and the amount of time elapsed on the track.  Some portable CD players can play CD-R/CD-RW discs and some can play other formats such as MP3-encoded audio. While audio typically is output via a headphone connector, higher-end models may feature an additional integrated speaker.

The 8 cm CD provides a smaller alternative to the normal 12 cm CD (although with a lower capacity). Miniature players exist that play only this format.

Some portable CD players feature an externally-attached playback controller as depicted, to facilitate control while the main unit is placed in a bag or pocket.

Issues with recordable CDs 
Some early portable CD players do not play recordable CDs (CD-R, CD-RW) properly because of the way these CDs are recorded, and due to the significantly lower reflectivity of CD-RW.

A consumer-recorded CD is recorded by making marks in a thin layer of organic dye, which leads to incompatibility with some CD players. For some users of CD-Rs, the solution to this is to burn the CD at a slower speed or use a different brand of recordable CDs. Burning at too slow a speed can also cause issues. Ideally, CD-Rs should be burned at half their rated maximum speed, for example, a CD-R with a maximum rating of 48x should be burned at 24x.

Future 

The portable CD player was once a popular device for listening to music on-the-go, but with the advent of digital music players and streaming services, it has been phased out of use. The future after portable CD players have been phased out is one that is focused on digital music and streaming services.

One of the biggest changes is the rise of streaming services such as Spotify, Apple Music, and Tidal. These services allow users to access millions of songs on-demand, from a range of devices including smartphones, tablets, smart speakers, and laptops. The convenience and accessibility of streaming services have made them the preferred choice for music consumption for many people.

As streaming services continue to grow, the future of music may also become more personalized. With algorithms that can predict what songs and artists a listener will enjoy, streaming services can offer tailored playlists and recommendations to help people discover new music. This level of personalization is something that was not possible with portable CD players.

Another significant change is the shift from owning music to renting it. In the past, people would buy CDs and own them for life, but now with streaming services, people can pay a monthly subscription fee to access a vast library of music without owning any of it. This change has led to a more sustainable approach to music consumption as it reduces the waste associated with physical media production.

The phasing out of portable CD players has also led to the rise of wireless earbuds and headphones. These devices offer a more convenient and portable way to listen to music without the need for wires or bulky headphones. As technology continues to advance, it is likely that wireless earbuds will become even more popular, with features such as noise cancellation and biometric tracking.

See also 
 CD player
 Portable DVD Player
 Discman
 Walkman
 Personal stereo
 Portable audio player
 Portable media player

References 

Consumer electronics
Japanese inventions
Portable audio players
Portable media players
Compact disc